Gaston Arman de Caillavet (13 March 1869 – 13 January 1915) was a French playwright.

Early life
Gaston Arman de Caillavet was born on 13 March 1869. He was the son of Albert Arman de Caillavet and Léontine Lippmann. His maternal grandfather, Auguste Lippmann, was a banker of Jewish descent.

Career
De Caillavet was a playwright. From 1901 to 1915, he collaborated with Robert de Flers on many works, including light and witty operettas or comédies de boulevard, many of which were great successes.

Personal life
In April 1893 he married Jeanne Pouquet. He was a close friend of Marcel Proust who found in him and his fiancée, Jeanne Pouquet, a model of the relationship between Robert de Saint-Loup and Gilberte in his famous novel In Search of Lost Time.

Gaston and Jeanne had only one daughter, Simone, who married (second wedding) André Maurois, future biographer of Proust.

Works

 Les travaux d'Hercule, opéra bouffe in three acts, with Robert de Flers, music by Claude Terrasse, 1901
 Le Cœur a ses raisons..., comedy in one act, with Robert de Flers, premiered in Paris at the Théâtre de la Renaissance on 13 May 1902
 Le Sire de Vergy, opéra bouffe in three acts, with Robert de Flers, music by Claude Terrasse, premiered in Paris at the Théâtre des Variétés on 15 April 1903
 Les Sentiers de la vertu, comedy in three acts, with Robert de Flers, premiered in Paris at the Théâtre des Nouveautés on 7 December 1903
 La Montansier, historic comedy in 4 acts and a prologue, with Robert de Flers and Henry Ibels, premiered in Paris at the Théâtre de la Gaîté on 24 March 1904
 Monsieur de La Palisse, opéra-bouffe in three acts, with Robert de Flers, music by Claude Terrasse, premiered in Paris at the Théâtre des Variétés on 2 November 1904
 L'ange du foyer, comedy in three acts, with Robert de Flers, premiered in Paris at the Théâtre des Nouveautés on 19 March 1905
 La Chance du mari, comedy in one act, with Robert de Flers, premiered in Paris at the Théâtre du Gymnase on 16 May 1906
 Miquette et sa mère, comedy in three acts, with Robert de Flers, premiered in Paris at the Théâtre des Variétés on 2 November 1906
 Fortunio, opera in four acts and five tableaux, after Le Chandelier by Alfred de Musset, with Robert de Flers, music by André Messager, premiered in Paris at the Opéra-Comique on 5 June 1907
 L'Amour veille, comedy in four acts, with Robert de Flers, premiered in Paris at the Comédie-Française on 1 October 1907
 L'éventail, comedy in four acts, with Robert de Flers, premiered in Paris at the Théâtre du Gymnase on 29 October 1907
 Le Roi, comedy in four acts, with Robert de Flers and Emmanuel Arène, premiered in Paris at the Théâtre des Variétés on 24 April 1908
 L'âne de Buridan, comedy in three acts, with Robert de Flers, premiered in Paris at the Théâtre du Gymnase on 19 February 1909
 Le Bois sacré, comedy in three acts, with Robert de Flers, premiered in Paris at the Théâtre des Variétés on 22 March 1910 
 La Vendetta, opera in three acts, with Robert de Flers, after a novel by Loriot-Lecaudey, music by Jean Nouguès, premiered at the Opéra de Marseille on 27 January 1911
 Papa, comedy in three acts, with Robert de Flers, premiered in Paris at the Théâtre du Gymnase on 11 February 1911
 Primerose, comedy in three acts, with Robert de Flers, premiered in Paris at the Comédie-Française on 9 October 1911
 L'Habit vert, comedy in four acts, with Robert de Flers, premiered in Paris at the Théâtre des Variétés on 16 November 1912
 La belle aventure, comedy in three acts, with Robert de Flers and Étienne Rey, premiered in Paris at the Théâtre du Vaudeville on 23 December 1913
 Béatrice, opera in four acts, with Robert de Flers, after a story by Charles Nodier, music by André Messager, 1914
 Monsieur Brotonneau, play in three acts, with Robert de Flers, premiered in Paris at the Théâtre de la Porte Saint-Martin on 8 April 1914
 Cydalise et le Chèvre-pied, ballet in two acts and three tableaux, with Robert de Flers, music by Gabriel Pierné, 1923
 Le Jardin du paradis, musical story in four acts after Hans Christian Andersen, with Robert de Flers, music by Alfred Bruneau, 1923

Filmography 
Il bosco sacro, directed by Carmine Gallone (Italy, 1915, based on the play Le Bois sacré)
, directed by Mauritz Stiller (Sweden, 1915, based on the play La belle aventure) 
The Beautiful Adventure, directed by Dell Henderson (1917, based on the play La belle aventure) 
L'asino di Buridano, directed by Eleuterio Rodolfi (Italy, 1917, based on the play L'Âne de Buridan) 
Love Watches, directed by Henry Houry (1918, based on the play L'amour veille) 
Primerose, directed by Mario Caserini (Italy, 1919, based on the play Primerose) 
The King on Main Street, directed by Monta Bell (1925, based on the play Le Roi) 
The Beautiful Adventure, directed by Reinhold Schünzel (Germany, 1932, based on the play La belle aventure) 
**The Beautiful Adventure, directed by Reinhold Schünzel and Roger Le Bon (French, 1932, based on the play La belle aventure) 
Buridan's Donkey, directed by Alexandre Ryder (France, 1932, based on the play L'Âne de Buridan) 
, directed by René Guissart (France, 1934, based on the play Primerose) 
Miquette, directed by Henri Diamant-Berger (France, 1934, based on the play Miquette et sa mère) 
Äventyret, directed by Per-Axel Branner (Sweden, 1936, based on the play La belle aventure) 
The King, directed by Pierre Colombier (France, 1936, based on the play Le Roi) 
, directed by Léon Mathot (France, 1937, based on the play L'Ange du foyer) 
, directed by Henry Roussel (France, 1937, based on the play L'amour veille) 
The Green Jacket, directed by Roger Richebé (France, 1937, based on the play L'Habit vert) 
Monsieur Brotonneau, directed by Alexander Esway (France, 1939, based on the play Monsieur Brotonneau) 
Papacito lindo, directed by Fernando de Fuentes (Mexico, 1939, based on the play Miquette et sa mère) 
Sacred Woods, directed by Léon Mathot (France, 1939, based on the play Le Bois sacré) 
Miquette, directed by Jean Boyer (France, 1940, based on the play Miquette et sa mère) 
, directed by Robert Péguy (France, 1942, based on the play Papa) 
The Beautiful Adventure, directed by Marc Allégret (France, 1942, based on the play La belle aventure) 
A Royal Affair, directed by Marc-Gilbert Sauvajon (France, 1949, based on the play Le Roi) 
Miquette, directed by Henri-Georges Clouzot (France, 1950, based on the play Miquette et sa mère) 
, directed by Annelise Reenberg (Denmark, 1955, based on the play La belle aventure) 
, directed by Toivo Särkkä (Finland, 1962, based on the play La belle aventure)

References

1869 births
1915 deaths
20th-century French dramatists and playwrights
French opera librettists
French ballet librettists
Musical theatre librettists
French male dramatists and playwrights
Marcel Proust